Studio Kaab Inc., headquartered in Gangnam-gu Seoul, Korea, was a major Korean anime and entertainment company. The company is commonly referred to as "Kaab" (Korean Advanced Amusement Brand).

Studio Kaab also produced an anime review entertainment, Korea; as well as a Korean language version of Spheres animation and an animation called Nalong. It used to other animation, and featured storylines inappropriate for Clover 4/3, though not animated entertainment (see Anime).

Studio Kaab is confirmed to closed, but the generally-known date is 31 March 2018.

Productions
Clover 4/3 (2000)
Spheres (2003)
Nalong (2004)
Nalong 2 (Nalong Season 2, 2006)
Astronaut Family (2005)
Levehavaf Empire (2006)
 Revbahaf: The Story of Rebuilding the Kingdom(2007)
Gigatribe (2008)
Green Saver (Nalong Season 3, 2009)
Paper Town (Scenario) (2012)
Flower Boy, Hwarang (2014)

See also
Iconix Entertainment
Contemporary culture of South Korea
Korean animation
List of South Korean companies

External links

Spheres Homepage
Nalong Homepage
Clover 4/3 Blog
Iconix Entertainment Homepage

South Korean animation studios
Entertainment companies of South Korea
Toy companies of South Korea
Mass media companies established in 2001 
Toy companies established in 2001
South Korean companies established in 2001